Tom Hall is an Australian electronic audio-visual artist, who resides in Lake Arrowhead, California.

Hall's work is characterized by field recordings, synthesizers, computer software processing, and improvisation, which generates a large range of possible sounds including; melodic rhythms, ambient textures, and drone.

Hall's eclectic works flourish by utilizing a variety of mediums, each that reflects his varied background and interests. With a strong focus on elements of the everyday Hall's practice involves explorations into place, space, and time. Drawing inspiration from countless 'peripheral' spaces, Hall focuses on using multiple approaches to engage and recontextualize them to the public.

Hall focuses on and uses sound as a means to translate feelings, create hybrid environments and notions of journey. Stylistically these outcomes vary from noise-orientated improvisation to structured drone, melody, and rhythm.

Biography
Hall is a graduate of The Australian National University with Honours where he majored in Photomedia, studying under the guidance of Dr. Martyn Jolly. During Hall's time at university he spent 1 year abroad (2004) on a scholarship studying sound and moving image at Kyoto Seika University.

Discography

(2004) Irashai Mase – Sonoptik
(2007) Fluere – Sonoptik
(2006) Floats – Nightrider Records
(2008) Cross – hellosQuare
(2010) Past Present, Below – Overlap.org
(2011) Distressed – Sonoptik
(2011) Muted Angels – Complicated Dance Steps
(2013) Many Days End – Sonoptik
(2017) True Image – (Ltd Ed. 50 released at the LA Art Bookfair)
(2017) Fervor – Elli Records
(2018) Spectra – Elli Records
(2020) The Day After You Die – Sonoptik
(2020) Bestowed Order On Chaos – Errorgrid
(2021) Failed Attempts at Silence – Superpang

Collaborations
(2008) Euphonia w/ Lawrence English – Presto!?

References

External links
 Official Website
 Instagram
 Soundcloud
 Vimeo

1980 births
Living people
Ableton Live users
Australian electronic musicians
Australian artists
Australian National University alumni
People from Tasmania
People from Brisbane
Australian sound artists